The Scottish Young Conservatives (SYC) is the youth wing of the Scottish Conservatives for members aged 25 and under. The organisation shares the same values and policies as its parent political party with branches being an integrated part of local associations. SYC is both social and political, aiming to bring together young conservatives and encouraging young people to get involved in campaigning.

Unlike Young Conservatives (UK), SYC has an elected executive board, consisting of 3 national officers, Chair, National Campaigns Coordinator and Secretary, and 3 Regional Chairs. The organisation has formed itself into three regions. Within the regions University Conservative and Unionist Associations sit under the local Conservative branches.

The Scottish Young Conservatives were founded in 2018 after the dissolving of Conservative Future Scotland, with its inaugural chair being James Bundy. The committee consists of a total of six positions. Including the National Chair, these are; National Campaigns Co-ordinator, National Secretary, North Regional Chair, East Regional Chair, West Regional Chair.

Biography
The Scottish Young Conservatives succeeded Conservative Future Scotland as the youth wing of the Scottish Conservatives. CFS was formed in 2005 and dissolved shortly after the 2017 general election. The new youth branch kept relatively similar goals and objectives with the key difference being in the new organisational structure of SYC. The role of Non-voting member was abolished and Regional Chairs became responsible for Young Conservative activities and events, without exclusive representation for just University Associations.

References

See also

 Scottish Conservatives
 Scottish Unionism
 Glasgow University Conservative Association 
 University of Aberdeen Conservative and Unionist Association 
 Edinburgh University Conservative and Unionist Association

Conservative Future
Young
Conservatives
2005 disestablishments in Scotland